Toynbee Hall is a charitable institution that works to address the causes and impacts of poverty in the East End of London and elsewhere. Established in 1884, it is based in Commercial Street, Spitalfields, and was the first university-affiliated institution of the worldwide settlement movement—a reformist social agenda that strove to get the rich and poor to live more closely together in an interdependent community. It was founded by Henrietta and Samuel Barnett in the economically depressed East End, and was named in memory of their friend and fellow reformer, Oxford historian Arnold Toynbee, who had died the previous year.

Toynbee Hall continues to strive to bridge the gap between people of all social and financial backgrounds, with a focus on working towards a future without poverty.

History
Shortly after their marriage in 1873, Samuel Barnett and his wife, Henrietta, moved to the Whitechapel district of the East End of London. Barnett was vicar of St Jude's church, where he saw poverty at first hand. Late-Victorian Whitechapel was known for its overcrowded living spaces and high criminal activity. In the area of Whitechapel alone, the mortality rate for children under the age of five was around 60% mostly due to the tight living conditions. Charles Booth, another social reformer, mapped London according to eight different social classes, finding that around 70% of people living in the East End were in the lowest three classes.

Whitechapel was also a place where many different immigrants settled. The Great Famine of Ireland in the 19th century led to many Irish settling in Whitechapel. Also, many Jewish immigrants settled in Whitechapel after fleeing from persecution in Western Europe at the time.

The Barnetts used their roles in the parish to improve the Whitechapel area. They built a church library, introduced art exhibits, brought university lecturers in, and took their parishioners on excursions to the homes of the wealthy and to universities. The Barnetts also tried to encourage officials to improve sanitation and housing and to build more playgrounds and washhouses. However, the attempts the Barnetts made with the parish had little effect on the East End community as a whole. The parish did not reach everyone that lived in the East End. Many of the people did not involve themselves with the established church. In an effort to improve the wellbeing of the community, Barnett had the idea of sharing knowledge and culture. His proposal was to have university students come as volunteers to share their knowledge: the students would be able to help the poor, and at the same time witness poverty at first hand, and potentially develop solutions for it.

In 1883, Barnett gave a lecture at St John's College, Oxford to gain support for his idea. Barnett was able to gather enough support and a committee called the "University Settlement of East London" was set up by Oxford. With these ideas and the support of universities, Barnett founded Toynbee Hall, the first settlement house in the world. Named after another social reformer, Arnold Toynbee, Toynbee Hall first opened its doors on Christmas Eve in 1884. Samuel Barnett was named as the first warden of the hall and Oxford and Cambridge university students came to work at the hall.

By 1910 more settlement houses were founded in England in the areas of Manchester, Glasgow, Edinburgh, Dundee, Birmingham, Liverpool, and elsewhere in London; as well as in Holland, France, Germany, Sweden, Denmark, Finland, Austria, and the United States. In 1911 the leaders of the social settlement movement founded the National Federation of Settlements. One of the best known settlement houses that was inspired after a visit to Toynbee Hall is Hull House in Chicago, founded by Jane Addams and Ellen Gates Starr in 1889.

Over time Toynbee Hall implemented many different educational community programmes. At its opening, Toynbee Hall introduced University Extension Society lectures. These lectures were taught by university professors. At the programme's peak, in the 1890s, classes were taught in over 134 topics including; literature, zoology, ethics, philosophy, etc. In order to further promote education, 36 societies or clubs were created in different areas, such as, music, art, history, and science. One of these societies was founded in 1889 and was called the "Toynbee Travellers". This group was created after a group of Toynbee Hall residents travelled to Belgium in 1887. Toynbee Hall also began hosting Smoking Room Debates in which community members and invited speakers would come to debate issues of the day. This tradition continued for over twenty years. In 1899, the Poor Man's Lawyer service was introduced. This programme gives free legal services to those who can not afford it, and continues to the present day.

The settlement movement

The international settlement movement began at Toynbee Hall, where a community centre was formed that attracted university students who wished to live or "settle" among the underprivileged in London's economically depressed East End. They came, according to Samuel Barnett, "to learn, as much as to teach, to receive as much as to give". As at most settlement houses, its social workers—students from Oxford and Cambridge Universities, among others—resided at Toynbee Hall and sought thereby to get to know their neighbors and their needs on a more intimate, personal level.

Toynbee Hall rejected the concept of a community centre as a location for Christian proselytisingas seen in the efforts of the Salvation Army. This principle is reflected in the decision to name it after the social reformer, Arnold Toynbee, who had died in 1883, aged 30. As Henrietta Barnett explained, the name would be "free from every possible savor of a mission."

From the beginning, it was non-sectarian and welcomed people of all faiths, despite having been founded by a Church of England cleric. It saw its purpose as more educational than charitable, in a missionary sense. Gertrude Himmelfarb lists some of the activities offered by Toynbee Hall in a typical month: "evening classes on arithmetic, writing, drawing, citizenship, chemistry, nursing, and music (...); afternoon classes for girls on dressmaking, writing and composition, geography, bookkeeping, needlework, hygiene, reading and recitation, French, singing, cooking, and swimming; and evening sessions devoted to the discussion of legal principles and current social issues".

By 1900 there were over 100 settlements in the United States and across the UK, and in 1911 the leaders of the social settlement movement founded the National Federation of Settlements.

Current activity
Today, Toynbee Hall provides a range of programmes and activities, broadly broken down into: youth, the elderly, financial inclusion, debt, advice, free legal advice and community engagement.

Each year over 400 volunteers help to deliver the charity's services.

In 2006 Toynbee Hall launched Capitalise, a pan-London free debt advice service to support 20,000 people a year with their money worries. In April 2019 this service was rebranded as Debt Free London.

In 2007 the Toynbee Studios opened in part of the building offering dance and media studios and a theatre.

Buildings
Toynbee Hall, the original building that houses the organisation of the same name, is located in Commercial Street, Spitalfields, in the London Borough of Tower Hamlets. It was designed by Elijah Hoole in a Tudor-Gothic style, and was formally opened in January 1885. It was built on the site of a disused industrial school, and adjacent to the church of St Jude (built in 1845–46, but demolished in 1927). It was designated a Grade II listed building in 1973. The front of the building bears a Greater London Council blue plaque, erected in 1984, commemorating Jimmy Mallon, warden 1919–54.

Since its foundation, the charity has expanded from the original building into a number of extensions and other neighbouring buildings.

People

Wardens
1884–1906 Samuel Barnett
1906–11 Thomas Edmund Harvey
1914-17 John St George Currie Heath
1919–54 James Joseph Mallon
1954–63 Arthur Eustace Morgan
1963–64 Jack Catchpool
1964–72 Walter Birmingham
1977–87 Donald Piers Chesworth
1987–92 Alan Lee Williams OBE
1992–98 Alan Prescott
1998–2008 Revd Professor Luke Geoghegan
2008–17 Graham Fisher
2017– James Minton

Chair of trustees
 1884–96 Philip Lyttelton Gell, first chairman
 Charles Alfred Elliott
 1911–25 Alfred Milner
 1933–45 Cosmo Lang
 1966 Lord Blakenham
 1982–5 John Profumo
 1985–90 Sir Harold Atcherley
 1990–2002 Roger Harrison
 2002–2009 Christopher Coombe
 2009–2015 Ben Rowland
 2015–2022 Julian Corner
 2022– Steven Burns

Notable associated people
Toynbee residents included R. H. Tawney and Clement Attlee.
William Beveridge began his career by working as Sub-Warden at Toynbee Hall from 1903 to 1905.
Visitors to Toynbee Hall included Lenin and Guglielmo Marconi. The latter made the first public presentation of his wireless invention in Toynbee Hall on December 12, 1896.
Lionel Ellis (1885–1970), the military historian, was an Associate Warden of Toynbee Hall after the Second World War. Between the two World Wars, he had been General Secretary of the National Council of Social Service and then Secretary of the National Fitness Council.
John Profumo dedicated much of his time to the Hall from the 1960s onwards after the Profumo affair forced him out of politics.
Social reformers from the United States, such as Jane Addams and Gaylord Starin White, visited Toynbee Hall, which inspired their work to establish Hull House in Chicago and Union Settlement in New York City, respectively.
Sir Nicolas Bratza, was a volunteer at Toynbee Hall's Free Legal Advice Centre in the 1970s. He went on to become the President of the European Court of Human Rights from November 2011 to October 2012. In 2014, Sir Nicolas became an Ambassador for Toynbee Hall.
 Marie-Jeanne Bassot visited Hull House, which inspired her establishment of la Résidence sociale in Levallois-Perret (France).

Associated organisations
Charles Robert Ashbee created his Guild of Handicraft whilst a resident at Toynbee Hall in the late 1880s.
The Whitechapel Art Gallery (founded 1901) grew out of annual free art exhibitions organised by Henrietta Barnett.
The Workers Educational Association (WEA) was founded here in 1903.
Child Poverty Action Group was founded at a meeting held at Toynbee Hall in 1965.
Stepney Children's Fund

References

Further reading
 (on the opening of the new Toynbee Studios)

External links

 Toynbee Art Club Website for the club that was established in 1886 by C. R. Ashbee during his residence at Toynbee Hall.
 LinkAge Plus Toynbee Hall page on LinkAge Plus site.

1884 establishments in England
Social welfare charities based in the United Kingdom
Cultural and educational buildings in London
Education in the London Borough of Tower Hamlets
Grade II listed buildings in the London Borough of Tower Hamlets
History of education in the United Kingdom
History of the London Borough of Tower Hamlets
Organisations based in London
Settlement houses in the United Kingdom
Spitalfields
Commercial Street, London